Christopher James Lucketti (born 28 September 1971) is an English football manager and former professional player.

He played as a central defender. In a playing career of over 600 games, Lucketti began his career at home town club Rochdale in 1989 before moving to Halifax Town, Bury- for whom he made over 250 appearances - Preston North End, Huddersfield Town and Sheffield United.

After his playing career ended, Lucketti moved into coaching and management with roles including assistant manager at Scunthorpe United and Salford City alongside Graham Alexander, caretaker manager of Fleetwood Town and manager at Bury. He was most recently the assistant manager at Motherwell working alongside Graham Alexander.

Playing career

Halifax Town, Bury and Huddersfield Town
Born in Littleborough, Lancashire, Lucketti started his professional career with Halifax Town where he made 78 appearances between 1991 and 1993. In 1993, he moved to Bury; there he made a total of 235 first-team appearances, winning back-to-back promotions in the 1995–96 and 1996–97 seasons.

In 1999, he joined Huddersfield Town and made 76 appearances for the Terriers, scoring twice, against Scunthorpe United in the League Cup and Crystal Palace in the league.

Preston North End
Lucketti moved to Preston North End in a £750,000 deal from Huddersfield at the start of the 2001–02 season. He played over 200 times for the Deepdale club. In the 2004–05 season, he formed formidable partnerships with both Claude Davis and Youl Mawene in the Preston defence, helping his team to the Play-off final at Millennium Stadium in Cardiff.

Sheffield United
In March 2006, Lucketti joined Sheffield United for the remainder of the 2005–06 season, making three first-team appearances before signing a one-year deal on 1 June 2006 with the Blades with both clubs agreeing to a fee of £250,000.

Lucketti made his first-team debut for the Blades whilst on loan, appearing in the 1–1 home draw with Leeds United on 18 April 2006.

On 13 January 2007, he made his Premiership debut at the age of 35 against Portsmouth and went on to make a handful of Premiership appearances over the rest of the season. In July 2007, after being linked with a moved to Hull City, he signed a new one-year contract. Despite being re-signed by newly appointed manager Bryan Robson, he featured even less for the Blades under the new boss. He scored what turned out to be his only United goal in the League Cup against MK Dons on 28 August 2007.

On 27 March 2008, he signed on loan until the end of the season for Southampton, making four appearances for the Saints. Under the terms of his loan deal he was eligible to play in the final game of the season between Sheffield United and Southampton, a match which both sides desperately needed to win to try to finish in the play-offs and to avoid relegation respectively, but Lucketti opted to declare himself unavailable for the match to avoid a conflict of interests.

Return to Huddersfield
On 4 July 2008, Lucketti signed a two-year deal at Football League One side Huddersfield Town, seven years after leaving them to join Preston North End. He returned on a free transfer after Sheffield United agreed to cancel the last year of his contract. The following day, he was appointed club captain of the Terriers. He made his second Town debut in the 1–1 draw against Stockport County at the Galpharm Stadium on 9 August 2008. On 25 October, he was sent off in a league match against Peterborough United, where Town lost 4–0. He didn't reappear in the Town first team until 28 February 2009, when he came on as a substitute in the 1–1 draw against Stockport County at Edgeley Park.

After being left out of Lee Clark's squad for the whole of the 2009—10 season, he left the club on 17 May 2010.

Coaching and managerial career

Fleetwood Town
Lucketti moved into coaching and management with youth roles at Preston North End F.C then as Assistant Manager working alongside Graham Alexander at Fleetwood Town. After Alexander's dismissal. Lucketti was asked to stay on as Caretaker Manager, becoming Assistant Manager again on the appointment of Steven Pressley in October 2015.

Scunthorpe United
In June 2016, Lucketti moved to work with Alexander again at Scunthorpe United with the team finishing third in League One in 2016-17.

Bury
On 22 November 2017, Lucketti was approached to become manager at Bury replacing Lee Clark. When Lucketti took over, Bury were in the relegation zone and suffering from a number of injuries  His contract, along with that of assistant Joe Parkinson, was terminated by the club on 15 January 2018

Salford City
After working with Graham Alexander as Assistant Manager at both Fleetwood Town and Scunthorpe United, Lucketti was appointed his Assistant Manager for a third time at Salford City in May 2018  During their time at Salford City, Alexander and Lucketti reached the EFL Trophy Final and achieved back to back promotions before their departure in the early part of the 2020-21 season.

Motherwell
On 8 January 2021, Lucketti was announced as assistant manager of Motherwell alongside Graham Alexander with whom he was worked at a number of clubs.

Managerial statistics

References

External links
Official profile at HTFC
Official profile at SUFC
Official profile at SFC

1971 births
Living people
People from Littleborough, Greater Manchester
English footballers
Association football central defenders
Rochdale A.F.C. players
Stockport County F.C. players
Halifax Town A.F.C. players
Huddersfield Town A.F.C. players
Bury F.C. players
Preston North End F.C. players
Sheffield United F.C. players
Southampton F.C. players
Fleetwood Town F.C. managers
Bury F.C. managers
Premier League players
English Football League players
English Football League managers
Scunthorpe United F.C. non-playing staff
Salford City F.C. non-playing staff
Motherwell F.C. non-playing staff
English football managers
English people of Italian descent